Ryongjŏng station is a railway station of the Korean State Railway in Ryongjŏng, Ŭnnyul County, South Hwanghae Province, North Korea. It was the terminus of the narrow-gauge Sŏhaeri Line. The station and the branch line have been out of use since 2002.

History
Ryongjŏng Station was opened by the Korean State Railway in 1964, along with the rest of the Ch'ŏlgwang–Ryongjŏng branch line.

References

Railway stations in North Korea